The Challenge League is the second-highest tier of the Swiss football league system and lower of two professional leagues in the country. Ten teams play in the Challenge League; the winners of the league are promoted to the Super League, while the bottom-placed team is relegated to the Promotion League.

2022–23 clubs

Promotion/relegation from 2021–22 season
FC Lausanne-Sport (10th) was relegated from the Swiss Super League.
FC Winterthur was promoted to the Swiss Super League.
SC Kriens was relegated to the Promotion League.
AC Bellinzona was promoted from the Promotion League.

History

Serie B and Serie Promotion

The Serie B was first carried out in 1898. In the year before, Genevan newspaper La Suisse Sportive organized the first inofficial Swiss Championship, where the Coupe Ruinart was awarded to Grasshopper Club Zürich. The first Serie B was competed for this same cup. The final game was held between Cantonal Lausanne, FC Bern, and Vereinigte St. Gallen, with Cantonal Lausanne beating first FC Bern 2-0 and then Vereinigte St. Gallen 3-2 to win the championship. In the 1900-01 season, Serie B winner Fortuna Basel were the first team to be promoted to the Serie A. In the following two seasons, the second teams of Grasshopper Club Zürich and FC Zürich won the Serie B and thus no teams were promoted. The Serie B was held under this name until 1922. However, records of these times are spotty at best. 

In 1922, the league was renamed to Serie Promotion and was split into three regions East, West, and Central with each region further subdivided into two groups. The respective regional group winners played a final game and the three regional champions qualified for the final round. While SC Veltheim won the first Serie Promotion, all three participants of the final round were promoted to the Serie A. In the following seasons, regional Serie B champions played relegation/promotion playoffs against the last placed of the regional leagues in the Serie A. This format would persist until the 1929-30 season. 

Starting in 1930, both Serie A and B were renamed to First and Second League, respectively, and in the season after the Second League become the First League (as the previous First League became known as the National League). These name changes came as a push to create the aforementioned National League, which no longer would be split into regional groups. This reorganization was finally realized for the 1933-34 season, however the First League maintained regional groups. The league was split into a western and eastern group, except in the 1939/40 season where five regional groups were created due to the World War.

National League B Era

Starting with the 1944-45 season, the National League B (NLB) was created. Fourteen teams, the top seven teams of both groups in the 1943-44 season, minus champions AC Bellinzona, plus the relegated FC Luzern, would participate in the inaugural season. Initially, the top two of the league were promoted, while the bottom two were relegated. In the 1976-77 season, the number of teams was increased to sixteen. After the number of teams was reverted in 1979, the number of teams was increased again in 1981. This incease was also mirrored by the National League A. 

For the 1986-87 season, playoffs between the top four of the NLB and the bottom four of the NLA were played, with only two of them getting promoted, as the NLA would reduce the number of teams to twelve for the next season. At the same time the NLB was increased to 24 teams, split once again into two regional groups. Furthermore, the seasons were also split into two stages: a qualifying stage and promotion/relegation stage. During the promotion/relegation stage, the bottom four teams of the NLA would be joined by the top six of both groups. These sixteen teams were once again split into two groups and the top two of both groups would gain promotion to the NLA. For relegation, the bottom six teams of either group were shuffled into two groups, where the bottom two of both groups are relegated to the First League. 

The number of teams in the NLB was reduced to 20 in 1993 and further reduced to 16 in 1994. Starting with the 1995-96 season, the NLB was once again reunited and slimmed down to twelve teams. The promotion/relegation and relegation playoffs would also no longer be split into two groups. Both playoffs would be played in a round-robin group with eight teams, with the top four promoted/remaining in the NLA and NLB, respectively. Bottom four would be relegated/remain in the NLB or First League, respectively.

Challenge League Era
At the beginning of the 20th century, further format changes to the top Swiss leagues were suggested. Starting with the 2003-04 season, the league was renamed to Challenge League. Unlike the top league, the Super League, the Challenge League did not have a title sponsor at first, until the 2008-09 season which was named the Dosenbach Challenge League. The league would again be without a title sponsor for the following four season. Between 2013 and 2021, it was named brack.ch Challenge League and since the 2021-22 season it is called the dieci Challenge League.

The number of participants has fluctuated since the renaming of the league. Initially, the Challenge League had 17 participants, but in the following season it was increased to 18. To make the league more attractive to viewers, it was reduced again to 16 participants in 2008 and then further down to ten in 2012. This last reduction came as a result of the creation of the Promotion League. Similarly, the number of teams relegated and promoted to and from the former First League (later Promotion League) had also fluctuated. With the new Promotion League, it has been a simple 1-up 1-down promotion/relegation format between Challenge League and Promotion League. 

Promotion to the Super League had also been restructured along with the name changes. The old promotion/relegation playoffs were scrapped and replaced with the simpler 1-up 1-down format. Between 2003 and 2012, the second placed team of the Challenge League would also play a two-legged promotion/relegation playoff against the second-to-last team of the Super League. This playoff was dropped in 2012 and later reintroduced for the 2018-19 season.

Results

Nationalliga B Era

1 FC Lugano and FC Lausanne-Sport went bankrupt which meant that no team was relegated due to their league position. FC Sion  were not awarded a license for the 2003–04 season resulted in an extra team being promoted.

Challenge League Era
The league statistics of the Challenge League era:

See also
Sports league attendances

References

External links 

 Swiss Challenge League tables & results at soccerway.com

 
Sports leagues established in 1897
2
Second level football leagues in Europe
Professional sports leagues in Switzerland